Segoro Puro or Segoropuro ((), a Javanese word literally means City of the Pirates) is a village in the Rejoso District, Pasuruan Regency, East Java, Indonesia.  The village is well known as the place where the tomb (see map) of a Da'i, Sayyid Abdurrahim ibn Abdurrahman Basyeiban or better known as Sayyid Arif Segoropuro, is located.

Climate
Segoropuro has a Tropical wet and dry climate, with distinct wet and dry seasons.
The village's wet season runs from May through Jan, while the dry season, where precipitation is less than 100 mm, covers the remaining three months. The temperature is relatively constant throughout the year with humidity is around 80% RH.

References

Kecamatan Rejoso 

Populated places in East Java
Villages in East Java
Pasuruan Regency